Dekh Kemon Lage is a Bengali language romantic comedy film directed by Abhijit Guha and Sudeshna Roy. Produced by Greentouch Entertainment and Nideas Creations and conceptualised by Prosenjit Chatterjee, the film features Soham Chakraborty and Subhashree Ganguly in lead roles with Avik Chongdar, Mir Afsar Ali, Sujan Neel Mukherjee, Roopsha Dasguupta Ray, Rupsha Chakraborty, Kharaj Mukherjee, Biswanath Basu, Laboni Sarkar, Kanchan Mullick and Payel Mukherjee in other supporting roles.

Cast
 Soham Chakraborty as Rahul Roy
 Subhashree Ganguly as Gunja
 Avik Chongdar as Boltu
 Mir Afsar Ali as Bijoy Uday Banerjer
 Kanchan Mullick
 Biplab Banerjee as Gunja's father
 Ambarish Bhattacharya as Sushil
 Subhadra as Rahul's mother
 Neel Mukherjee as Rahul's father
 Rupsa Chakraborty as Rahul's elder sister-in-law
 Rima Guha Thakurta as Raka
 Abhijit Guha as Jt. Commissioner of Police Haridas Paul
 Sudeshna Roy as Hostel principal
 Peyal Mukherjee

Soundtrack

References

External links
 

Bengali-language Indian films
2010s Bengali-language films
Indian romantic comedy films
Bengali remakes of Hindi films
2017 romantic comedy films
Films directed by Abhijit Guha and Sudeshna Roy
Films scored by Jeet Ganguly